The Ministry of Tourism was a ministry of the Government of Pakistan. It was established to develop the tourism industry in Pakistan. It was abolished after the eighteenth amendment to the Constitution of Pakistan was passed. Its main objectives and functions were largely transferred to the Pakistan Tourism Development Corporation (PTDC).

See also
Tourism in Pakistan

External links 
 Pakistan Tourism Development Corporation (PTDC)

Tourism
Tourism in Pakistan
Pakistan